The First Lady of Turkmenistan is the title attributed to the wife of the President of Turkmenistan.

First ladies of Turkmenistan

Muza Niyazova 
Muza Alekseýewna Niýazowa is the widow of the first president, Saparmyrat Nyýazow, with whom she had two children. An ethnic Russian, her husband distanced himself from her as he did not care to become an example of interethnic marriages in a position of power.

Ogulgerek Berdimuhamedova 

Ogulgerek Atayewna Berdimuhamedowa was the wife of the 2nd president Gurbanguly Berdimuhamedov. In 2021, during the visit of President of Turkey Recep Tayyip Erdogan, the first official photo of the Berdimuhamedova was taken. On 30 May 2022, Ogulgerek Berdimuhamedova was awarded the title of "Honored Carpet Weaver of Turkmenistan" for her many years at the carpet factory in the city of Geoktepe.

Serdar Berdimuhamedov's Wife 

Serdar Berdimuhamedow has been married since 2001. Nothing is known about the name and biography of his wife, but there are rumors according to which, like his mother, his wife is also named Ogulgerek.

References 

Turkmenistan
First Ladies of Turkmenistan